The 2022 Rhode Island General Treasurer election took place on November 8, 2022, to elect the General Treasurer of Rhode Island. 

Incumbent general treasurer Seth Magaziner was term-limited and could not seek re-election to a third term in office, initially running for governor before dropping out to run for U.S. House instead. Former two-term Democratic mayor of Central Falls James Diossa defeated Republican James Lathrop, finance director of North Kingstown.

Democratic primary

Candidates

Nominee 

 James Diossa, former mayor of Central Falls

Eliminated in primary 

 Stefan Pryor, Rhode Island Commerce Secretary

Declined 

 Marvin Abney, state representative (endorsed Diossa)
 Nick Autiello, former advisor to former Governor of Rhode Island Gina Raimondo
 Liz Beretta-Perik, treasurer of the Rhode Island Democratic Party
 Ryan Pearson, state senator (running for re-election)
 Scott Slater, state representative (running for re-election)

Endorsements

Polling

Results

Republican primary

Candidates

Nominee 

 James Lathrop, North Kingstown finance director

Declined 

 Allan Fung, former mayor of Cranston and nominee for Governor of Rhode Island in 2014 and 2018 (running for U.S. House)

Endorsements

Results

General election

Results

Notes

References 

General Treasurer
Rhode Island
Rhode Island General Treasurer elections